Lyces patula is a moth of the family Notodontidae first described by Francis Walker in 1864. It is endemic to montane central Colombia.

External links
Species page at Tree of Life Web Project

Notodontidae
Moths described in 1864